Mickleover is an electoral ward in the city of Derby, England.  The ward contains 13 listed buildings that are recorded in the National Heritage List for England.  Of these, two are listed at Grade II*, the middle of the three grades, and the others are at Grade II, the lowest grade.  The ward contains the village of Mickleover, later a suburb of the city, to the southwest of its centre.  All the listed buildings are near the centre of the village, and consist of houses and cottages with associated structures, a church and a war memorial.


Key

Buildings

References

Citations

Sources

 

Lists of listed buildings in Derbyshire
Listed buildings in Derby